Season 2003-04 saw Livingston compete in the Scottish Premier League. They also reached the semi-finals of the Scottish Cup and won the League Cup.

Summary
Livingston finished 9th in the Scottish Premier League during Season 2003–04. They went on to win Co-operative Insurance Cup after defeating Hibernian in the final and reached the semi final of the Scottish Cup losing to Celtic.

Managers
Livingston started the season under Márcio Máximo who had been appointed during the summer. On 14 October 2003 he resigned as manager and was replaced by David Hay who led the club to their Co-operative Insurance Cup win.

Fixtures and results

SPL

League Cup

Scottish Cup

Statistics

League table

References

Livingston
Livingston F.C. seasons